Zoran Knežević may refer to:

Zoran Knežević (astronomer) (born 1949), Serbian astronomer
Zoran Knežević (footballer) (born 1986), Serbian footballer
Zoran Knežević (politician) (1948–2014), Serbian politician